This article shows all releases by Doggystyle Records, split by year.

2000
 Tha Eastsidaz - Snoop Dogg Presents Tha Eastsidaz 
 Snoop Dogg - Tha Last Meal

2001
 Doggy's Angels - Pleezbaleevit!
 Tha Eastsidaz - Duces 'N Trayz: The Old Fashioned Way
 Bad Azz - Personal Business
 Various artists - Bones soundtrack
 Various artists - The Wash soundtrack

2002
 Various artists - Snoop Dogg Presents…Doggy Style Allstars Vol. 1
 Snoop Dogg - Paid tha Cost to Be da Bo$$

2003
 Kokane - Dr. Jekyll and Mr. Kane
 Welcome to tha chuuch mixtape vol.1 (Official mixtape)
 Welcome to tha chuuch mixtape vol.2 (Official mixtape)
 Welcome to tha chuuch mixtape vol.3 (Official mixtape)
 Welcome to tha chuuch mixtape vol.4 - Sunday School (Official mixtape)
 IV Life Underground Vol. 1 mixtape (Doggystyle/IV Life)

2004
 Snoop Dogg - R&G (Rhythm & Gangsta) The Masterpiece
 213 - The Hard Way
 Welcome to tha chuuch mixtape vol.5 - The revival (Official mixtape)
 Welcome to tha chuuch mixtape vol.6 - Testify (Official mixtape)
 Welcome to tha chuuch mixtape vol.7 - Step ya game up (Official mixtape)
 Welcome to tha chuuch mixtape vol.8 - Preach Tabarnacal (Official mixtape)

2005
 Welcome to tha chuuch mixtape vol.9 - Run Tell dat - The one and only (Official mixtape)
 Various artists - Welcome to tha Chuuch - Da Album
 IV Life Records & Tha Eastsidaz - Deuces, Tray's and Fo's (Doggystyle/IV Life)

2006
 West Coast Gangstas Starring - Tha Dogg Pound mixtape
 Tha Dogg Pound - Cali Iz Active
 Snoop Dogg - Tha Blue Carpet Treatment mixtape
 Snoop Dogg - The Blue Carpet Treatment

2007
 Various - Snoop Dogg presents : Unreleased Heatrocks
 Various - Snoop Dogg presents : The Big Squeeze
 Various - Mandatory Business soundtrack

2008
 Snoop Dogg - Ego Trippin'
 Dubb Union - Snoop Dogg Presents: Dubb Union

2009
 Snoop Dogg - Malice n Wonderland
 Various - Snoop Dogg presents: Bacc to tha Chuuch Vol.1

2010
 Snoop Dogg - More Malice

2011
 Snoop Dogg - Doggumentary

2015
 Snoop Dogg - BUSH

2016
 Snoop Dogg - Coolaid
 Jooba Loc - Only Way Out
 Kurupt - Equinox
 Various - The Return Of Doggy Style Records Mixtape
 Heebz Street featuring Iliana Eve - "Letters"

References

Discographies of American record labels
Snoop Dogg
Hip hop discographies